Rancho San Pedro was one of the first California land grants and the first to win a patent from the United States. The original Spanish land grant included what today consists of the Pacific coast cities of Los Angeles harbor, San Pedro, the Palos Verdes peninsula, Torrance, Redondo Beach, Hermosa Beach, and Manhattan Beach, and east to the Los Angeles River, including the cities of Lomita, Gardena, Harbor City, Wilmington, Carson, Compton, and western portions of Long Beach and Paramount.

History
Juan José Domínguez (1736–1809), a Spanish soldier, arrived in San Diego, California, in 1769 with Fernando Rivera y Moncada and served with the Gaspar de Portolà expedition and, along with Junípero Serra, traveled to San Juan Capistrano, San Gabriel, and Monterey.

Domínguez's original grazing permission stretched from present-day Compton to the Palos Verdes Peninsula but did not become a title to land until it was "re-granted" in 1822 in the Mexican era to Juan José's nephew and heir, Cristóbal Domínguez. Cristóbal died soon afterward, but his three sons settled on the ranch, building adobe homes. The following year Manuel Domínguez, eldest son of Cristóbal Domínguez, married María Engracia de Cota and commenced a successful career raising cattle and serving in a variety of elected and appointed offices in Los Angeles.

For many years, a portion of the Rancho San Pedro land grant was contested between the Domínguez and Sepúlveda families through various appeals to Spanish Governors and lawsuits from 1817–1883 and was eventually partitioned into seventeen parcels in 1882. The Sepúlveda family was awarded  known as Rancho de los Palos Verdes that later became the cities of the Palos Verdes Peninsula, as well as portions of Torrance and San Pedro.

With the cession of California to the United States following the Mexican–American War, the 1848 Treaty of Guadalupe Hidalgo provided that the land grants would be honored.

In 1869, Union Army Major General William Starke Rosecrans bought . The "Rosecrans Rancho" was bordered by what later was Florence Avenue on the north, Redondo Beach Boulevard on the south, Central Avenue on the east, and Arlington Avenue on the west.

Historic sites
 Dominguez Rancho Adobe. The adobe of Manuel Dominguez, completed in 1826, is a national historic site.
 Battle of Dominguez Rancho. The Mexican–American war battle was fought on the rancho site.
 The Claretians have been based, and gardened, adjacent to the Dominguez Rancho Adobe since circa 1900.

See also
List of Ranchos of California

References

San Pedro
San Pedro
Los Angeles Harbor Region
William Rosecrans
History of Long Beach, California
History of Torrance, California
History of Carson, California 
Compton, California
Lomita, California
Gardena, California
Paramount, California
Wilmington, Los Angeles
18th century in Los Angeles
19th century in Los Angeles
1828 establishments in Alta California